Laubach is a town of approximately 10,000 people in the Gießen region of Hesse, Germany. Surrounding Laubach are the towns of Hungen, Grünberg, Schotten and Lich.

Points of interest

The dense Laubach Woods spread into the foothills of the Vogelsberg Mountains. With its many historic and colorful half-timbered buildings, Laubach is an area of interest to tourists.

The main point of attraction is the castle, which is still owned by the count of Solms-Laubach. It was built in the thirteenth century and expanded over the years. The Solms castle has one of the largest private libraries in Europe, with over 120,000 titles. An original Gutenberg Bible, on display in the Johann Gutenberg Museum in Mainz, came from this private collection. The castle grounds include a huge park with a swan lake, open to the public.

The city's Evangelical Lutheran Church, formerly named St. Maria, has a Baroque organ. The oldest part of the church was built in the twelfth century.  It was renovated in the eighteenth century.

The former district courthouse, the city hall, and the Heimat Museum are together on the main street of Friedrichstrasse. The courthouse is now a residence for senior citizens.

The building was moved to its present location in 1832 and served as a school before it became a museum. The museum contains a permanent exhibit of the diary of city resident Friedrich Kellner.

Notable residents
 Friedrich Kellner (1885–1970) - Laubach's chief justice inspector during World War II, he wrote a 10-volume diary about the misdeeds of the Nazis, later published as a book, My Opposition. He became deputy mayor, first town councilman, and chairman of the regional branch of the Social Democrats. A Canadian documentary about Kellner was filmed on location in Laubach.
In 1909 he settled in Laubach with his wife, the writer Edith Blass.
 Friedel Münch (1927–2014), head of Münch Motorcycle Works
 Philipp Erasmus Reich (1717–1787), bookseller and publisher
 Georg Friedrich Solms-Laubach (1899–1969)
 Sophie von Solms-Laubach (1594–1651)
 Countess Monika zu Solms-Laubach (1929–2015), Princess Consort of Hanover

Laubach in the media

Literature

Film

Gallery

References

External links

Laubach Online (municipal website)

Giessen (district)